Molero is a surname. Notable people with the surname include:

 Armando Molero (1899/1900–1971), Venezuelan musician
 Juan Molero (born 1968), Puerto Rican former baseball player
 Xiomara Molero (born 1971), Puerto Rican former volleyball player